Samuel Abrahams is a BAFTA nominated English film director who has written and directed across drama, documentary and commercials.

His 2010 short film Connect starring Tuppence Middleton, described by The Guardian as "a bittersweet, elongated moment of romance on a bus, interspersed with a deliciously dark sense of humour" won the Jury Award at Encounters Short Film and Animation Festival and was nominated for a BAFTA for Best Short Film at the 64th British Academy Film Awards.

Samuel's 2011 short film Hold On Me, noted for its original use of dance, premiered at the BFI London Film Festival, won Best Short Film at the London Independent Film Festival, and was nominated for Fujifilm Shorts 2012 for its 35mm cinematography by director of photography Urszula Pontikos. Its visuals have been praised as being, "sumptuous yet intimate, textured and brimming with raw emotion."

In 2009, he directed the Channel 4 Comedy Lab, Hung Out which he co-wrote with a group of friends, loosely based on their lives.

He directed the split screen WWF commercial, 'The World Is Where We Live' and has also directed commercials for brands such as British Airways, Tourism Ireland, and Match.com.

References

External links
 
 Samuel Abrahams's Official Website

Living people
English screenwriters
English male screenwriters
English film directors
Year of birth missing (living people)